The Ridiculous 6 is a 2015 American Western action comedy film directed by Frank Coraci and written by Tim Herlihy and Adam Sandler, and starring Sandler, Terry Crews, Jorge Garcia, Taylor Lautner, Rob Schneider, and Luke Wilson. As Happy Madison Productions' first Western film, the plot follows six men who discover that they share the same bank-robbing father (Nick Nolte) and thereafter set out to reunite with him.

Released worldwide on Netflix on December 11, 2015, the film was panned by critics and is one of the few films to receive an approval rating of 0% on Rotten Tomatoes.

Plot
In the Old West, Tommy (Adam Sandler), known as "White Knife" by the American Indian tribe who raised him after his mother was murdered, is to marry a member of the tribe named Smoking Fox (Julia Jones) as arranged by his adoptive father Chief Screaming Eagle (Saginaw Grant). Following a run-in with Will Patch (Will Forte) and his Left-Eye Gang who claimed to have removed their right eye, as well as a one-eyed food proprietor named Clem (Steve Zahn), Tommy is visited by a bank robber named Frank Stockburn (Nick Nolte) who claims to be his biological father. Frank tells Tommy that he is dying of consumption and had amassed $50,000 buried in a meadow, which he offers to Tommy and his tribe.

The next day, a group of bandits led by the ruthless Cicero (Danny Trejo) come to the village and want Frank to give them his "big score.” Frank has the bandits kidnap him so he can lead them to the money at the so-called "Singing Windmill", in return for the bandits not attacking Tommy or the Natives. After searching the meadow Tommy is unable to find the stash of money and sets off on a quest to steal the amount needed and save his father.

During his journey, Tommy discovers that he has 5 half-brothers: Mexican burro rider Ramon (Rob Schneider) whose innkeeper mother had a fling with Frank; mentally stunted yet happy-go-lucky Lil' Pete (Taylor Lautner) whose strong neck makes him immune to hanging; mountain man Herm (Jorge Garcia) who speaks incomprehensibly and helped his mother sell their moonshine; a drunkard named Danny (Luke Wilson) who was the former bodyguard of Abraham Lincoln (Dan Patrick) and is guilt-ridden from accidentally leading John Wilkes Booth (Chris Kattan) to murder the president when he mistook him for a fan of the president on his way to the restroom; and African-American saloon pianist Chico (Terry Crews) who confesses to being half-White.

Meanwhile, Clem joins the Left-Eye Gang at the cost of his only functional eye and helps them abduct Smoking Fox. She escapes due to Clem's blindness and begins searching for Tommy and his half-brothers, now known as the Ridiculous 6.

After meeting Chico and Danny, the half-brothers have a run in with Chico's boss, sociopathic saloon owner Smiley Harris (Harvey Keitel), who was part of Frank's gang until Frank stole his cut of their biggest score and left him to die at the windmill. When Smiley attempts to kill the half-brothers out of revenge against Frank, he ends up being unintentionally decapitated by Ramon. The group later encounters Abner Doubleday (John Turturro) who is developing baseball with some Chinese immigrants.

The Left-Eye Gang soon catch up to the Ridiculous 6 while the latter are relaxing in a pond. The gang overpowers the Ridiculous 6 and steal their loot. Through Herm's ramblings, translated by Tommy, the Ridiculous 6 then decide to rob a gambling game in Yuma hosted by Ezekiel Grant (Jon Lovitz) and attended by Mark Twain (Vanilla Ice) and General George Armstrong Custer (David Spade). The Ridiculous 6 succeed, though Wyatt Earp (Blake Shelton) nearly jeopardizes their plan, and set off to ransom their father.

On the way, the Ridiculous 6 come across the Left-Eye Gang who have been left to die in the desert by Cicero. Tommy and the brothers rescue the Left-Eye Gang and reclaim the $50,000 they had stolen from them. That evening, Tommy sees a photograph carried by Danny that proves Cicero is the one who murdered his mother and sets off alone to rescue his father and confront the bandit leader. After meeting with Cicero and paying the ransom, Tommy confronts Cicero just and gets his revenge on his mother's killer.

The Ridiculous 6, who followed Tommy along with the Left-Eye Gang, have a reunion with their long-lost father. When Frank learns his sons exceeded his expectations by amassing $100,000, he reveals that he masterminded his abduction. But Tommy counters that his group had a Plan B: a hidden bomb inside the bag containing the ransom money. When the bomb explodes and commotion ensues, Frank runs off to a mine with Smoking Fox as his hostage. Tommy runs after them and successfully rescues his bride-to-be and captures his father.

Back in the Native Village, Tommy weds Smoking Fox with his half-brothers in attendance. Since the revelation that their biological father Frank Stockburn was no more than a two-bit crook, Screaming Eagle decides to adopt all the half-brothers as he did with Tommy. The Left-Eye Gang revealed that they lied about removing their right eyes, much to the anger of Clem.

In the post-credits, Abner Doubleday and his Chinese baseball team do a chant to detail their appreciation for the Stockburns.

Cast
 Adam Sandler as Tommy "White Knife" Dunson Stockburn, a man who was raised by American Indians.
 Henry Steckman as Young Tommy Stockburn
 Terry Crews as Chico Stockburn, a biracial saloon pianist and the half-brother of Tommy.
 Jorge Garcia as Herm Stockburn, a mountain man and the half-brother of Tommy who speaks incomprehensibly.
 Robin Leach as the voice of Herm Stockburn.
 Taylor Lautner as Pete "Lil Pete" Stockburn, a mentally stunted, strong-necked man with a happy-go-lucky personality and the half-brother of Tommy.
 Rob Schneider as Ramon Lopez Stockburn, a Mexican burro rider and the half-brother of Tommy.
 Luke Wilson as Danny Stockburn, the former bodyguard of Abraham Lincoln and the half-brother of Tommy.
 Nick Nolte as Frank Stockburn, a bank robber who is the biological father of Tommy, Chico, Herm, Lil' Pete, Ramon, and Danny.
 Will Forte as Will Patch, the leader of the Left-Eye Gang.
 Nick Swardson as Nelly Patch, a member of the Left-Eye Gang.
 Steve Zahn as Clem, a former general store owner with one eye who sides with the Left-Eye Gang.
 Julia Jones as Smoking Fox, a member of the Native American tribe that is assigned to marry Tommy.
 Lavell Crawford as Gus Patch, a member of the Left-Eye Gang.
 Jared Sandler as Babyface Patch, a member of the Left-Eye Gang.
 Paul Sado as "Stumbles" Patch, a member of the Left-Eye Gang.
 Danny Trejo as Cicero, the leader of a group of bandits who targets Frank.
 Ruben Rivera Young as Young Cicero
 Harvey Keitel as "Smiley" Harris, the owner of "The Golden Nugget" that Chico works for and former member of Frank's gang.
 Steve Buscemi as "Doc" Griffin, a doctor, dentist, and barber that works near "The Golden Nugget."
 David Spade as General George Armstrong Custer, he is seen attending a gambling game.
 Dana Goodman as Beaver Breath, a Native American whose name Will unintentionally guess the name of.
 Whitney Cummings as Susannah
 Jon Lovitz as Ezekiel Grant, the host of a gambling game.
 Saginaw Grant as Screaming Eagle, the tribal chief of the Native American tribe that adopted Tommy.
 Norm Macdonald as "The Golden Nugget" Customer. This was Macdonald's last on-screen film role before his death in 2021.
 Chris Parnell as William, a bank manager
 Blake Shelton as Wyatt Earp, a lawman that encounters the Ridiculous 6.
 John Turturro as Abner Doubleday, a Union Army soldier who was inventing baseball in this film.
 Vanilla Ice as Mark Twain, he is seen attending a gambling game.
 Dan Patrick as Abraham Lincoln, the 16th President of the United States who Danny used to work for.
 Tina Parker as Mary Todd Lincoln, the wife of Abraham Lincoln.
 Chris Kattan as John Wilkes Booth, a Confederate actor who killed Abraham Lincoln while Danny was in the restroom after he mistook him for a fan of the president.
 Jackie Sandler as "Never Wears Bra", a Native American who is friends with Smoking Fox.
 Blake Clark as the Sheriff of Rattler's Gulch
 Katalina Parrish as Sheriff's Wife
 Tim Herlihy as the Bartender of "The Golden Nugget."
 Sadie Sandler and Sunny Sandler as Dancing Kids
 Jonathan Loughran as "Rifleman"
 Kimo Keoke as "Short Stop", a Chinese baseball player who serves as the inspiration to the shortstop.
 James Ning as Qi, a Chinese baseball player.

Production
The Ridiculous 6 had been in production by Columbia Pictures, Paramount Pictures and Warner Bros., but was dropped by all three. The latter dropped out soon after Adam Sandler and Happy Madison Productions signed a four-picture deal with Netflix, although an insider noted to The Hollywood Reporter that the deal had nothing to do with their decision.

By January 2015, Netflix picked up the film with others joining the cast including Taylor Lautner, Nick Nolte, Blake Shelton, Steve Buscemi, Rob Schneider, Will Forte, Vanilla Ice and Luke Wilson. On February 16, 2015, Jorge Garcia joined the cast. Principal photography began on February 20, 2015, and ended on May 2, 2015.

On April 23, 2015, Indian Country Today Media Network reported that approximately "a dozen Native actors and actresses, as well as the Native cultural advisor, left the set of Adam Sandler’s newest film production, The Ridiculous Six" in protest of its portrayal of the Apache culture. The New York Daily News later reported that there were only four who left, out of over 100 Native American actors on the set. Navajo Nation tribal members Loren Anthony and film student Allison Young said they left because they felt the film portrayed Native Americans in a negative light and took satire too far. They also complained that the portrayal of women was degrading. A representative of Netflix responded saying, "The movie has ridiculous in the title for a reason: because it is ridiculous. It is a broad satire of Western movies and the stereotypes they popularized, featuring a diverse cast that is not only part of—but in on—the joke."

On May 4, 2015, the New York Daily News reported that Ricky Lee, one of the Native American actors on the Ridiculous 6 set, said previous news reports were exaggerated and indeed there were only "four actors who left, but there were 150 extras, including grandmas and grandpas and children, who kept working." Apparently, before the film's wrap party, he and several other actors were approached by Sandler to speak about the controversy. Lee considered that those who left raised legitimate issues but it was "the wrong battlefield."

Release
The film premiered on Netflix on December 11, 2015. On January 6, 2016, Netflix announced that the film had been viewed more times in 30 days than any other film in Netflix history. It also made it to the #1 spot in every territory in which Netflix operates.

Critical response
On Rotten Tomatoes, the film has an approval rating of 0% based on 37 reviews, with an average rating of 2.40/10. The site's critical consensus reads, "Every bit as lazily offensive as its cast and concept would suggest, The Ridiculous Six is standard couch fare for Adam Sandler fanatics and must-avoid viewing for film enthusiasts of every other persuasion." On Metacritic, the film has a weighted average score of 18 out of 100 based on reviews from 12 critics, indicating "overwhelming dislike".

Justin Chang of Variety wrote: "The scenery ain't bad but the laughs are tumbleweed-sparse in "The Ridiculous 6," a Western sendup so lazy and aimless, it barely qualifies as parody."
Mike McCahill of The Guardian gave it 2 out of 5 and wrote: "Peer through this dopey haze long enough, and you can't fail to notice the cavalier racial attitudes, the endlessly pliable women; you'd have every right to be outraged, were it not now par for the Sandler course."

References

External links
 The Ridiculous 6 on Netflix
 

2015 films
2010s English-language films
2015 action comedy films
2010s Western (genre) comedy films
American action comedy films
American Western (genre) comedy films
American satirical films
Race-related controversies in film
Native American-related controversies in film
Film controversies
Cultural depictions of George Armstrong Custer
Cultural depictions of John Wilkes Booth
Cultural depictions of Mark Twain
Cultural depictions of Wyatt Earp
Depictions of Abraham Lincoln on film
Films directed by Frank Coraci
Films produced by Adam Sandler
Films produced by Allen Covert
Films with screenplays by Adam Sandler
Films scored by Rupert Gregson-Williams
Happy Madison Productions films
English-language Netflix original films
2010s American films